James Harvey Miner (February 4, 1830August 18, 1913) was an American lawyer, Republican politician, and Wisconsin pioneer.  He was a member of the Wisconsin State Assembly, representing Richland County in the 1870 session, and served as district attorney and county judge.  He was also the principal editor of History of Richland County, Wisconsin (1906).

Early life
James H. Miner was born in Lockport, New York, in February 1830.  He lived his early years on his father's farm in Lockport.  The family moved west when James Miner was eight years old, settling in Hillsdale County, Michigan, where he was raised and educated.  He graduated from Hillsdale College (then known as Michigan Central College), and went on to study law with Judge E. H. C. Wilson.

In 1852, he moved to Potosi, Wisconsin, and read law in the office of Orsamus Cole until Cole joined the Wisconsin Supreme Court in 1855.  Miner was admitted to the bar at Lancaster, Wisconsin, in April 1855, then moved east to Richland Center, in Richland County, where he was one of the earliest settlers in that village.  He taught school for one winter, then began his legal career in a partnership with Daniel B. Priest.

Elected office
Miner was originally a member of the Whig Party, but joined the Republican Party when it was organized in 1854.  Running on the Republican ticket, he was elected district attorney of Richland County in 1856 and was subsequently re-elected in 1858.  In December of 1856, he was also one of the founding directors of the Pine River Valley Bank, but the Panic of 1857 ruined that business before it actually opened to the public.

He focused on his legal career in the early 1860s, but was then elected county judge in 1865, serving a four-year term.  While serving as judge, he was elected the 2nd village president of Richland Center in 1868.  The following year, in the fall of 1869, he was the Republican candidate for Wisconsin State Assembly in the Richland County district, and defeated "People's Democrat" Ira Sherwin Hazeltine.  He did not run for re-election in 1870.  

In 1876, he was chosen as a presidential elector for the Republican slate in Wisconsin, but was obliged to resign before the general election after he was appointed postmaster at Richland Center by President Grant.  He went on to serve five years as postmaster.  During this time, he was also appointed to the board of trustees of the industrial school at Waukesha and served a three year term.

Legal and business career

In 1878, Miner formed a legal partnership with James H. Berryman, who married his eldest daughter soon after.  That partnership continued for ten years.  In 1893, Miner partnered with his own son, Grant, in the firm Miner & Miner, which would endure for the rest of his life.  

In business, he was an investor and director in the Stevens Point & Pine River Valley Railroad, which was later purchased by the Chicago, Milwaukee & St. Paul Railroad.  He was later one of the organizers of the Richland Center state bank.  

James Miner died in August 1913, after a brief illness.

Personal life and family

James H. Miner was the seventh child of Luther Miner and his third wife, Lena Eleanor Grant.

His great grandfather, Jesse Miner, was one of the 1,500 Continental volunteers who took possession of Bunker Hill on June 16, 1775, and fought the British there in the Battle of Bunker Hill the following day.  The Miners trace their lineage back to Thomas Miner, who came to the Massachusetts Bay Colony in 1630 and later moved to the Connecticut Colony.  Ulysses S. Grant is also a descendant of this Thomas Miner.

Further back, the Miners traced the origin of their family name to Henry Bullman, who was given the name "Miner" by King Edward III of England, after he led a band of miners to war for the King during the first years of the Hundred Years' War.

James H. Miner married Sarah Ann Dunn in Volga, Iowa, on May 12, 1855.  Sarah Dunn was a native of Alleghany County, New York.  The Miners had five children, though one died in infancy.  Their eldest child, Alberka—"Berkie"—was the first graduate of the Richland High School and went on to marry Miner's one-time law partner, J. H. Berryman.  Miner's eldest son, Grant, followed his father into the legal profession and worked as his partner for much of the latter part of his life.

Electoral history

Richland County District Attorney (1856, 1858)

| colspan="6" style="text-align:center;background-color: #e9e9e9;"| General Election, November 4, 1856

| colspan="6" style="text-align:center;background-color: #e9e9e9;"| General Election, November 2, 1858

Richland County Judge (1865)

| colspan="6" style="text-align:center;background-color: #e9e9e9;"| General Election, April 4, 1865

Wisconsin Assembly (1869)

| colspan="6" style="text-align:center;background-color: #e9e9e9;"| General Election, November 2, 1869

Published works

References

1830 births
1913 deaths
Politicians from Lockport, New York
People from Hillsdale County, Michigan
People from Potosi, Wisconsin
People from Richland Center, Wisconsin
Hillsdale College alumni
Wisconsin Whigs
Wisconsin Republicans
Members of the Wisconsin State Assembly
District attorneys in Wisconsin
Wisconsin state court judges
Mayors of places in Wisconsin
Wisconsin pioneers